Laurent Dubreuil (born July 25, 1992) is a Canadian speed skater. He competes primarily in the short distances of 500 m and 1000 m. Dubreuil won his first World Cup medal during the 2014–15 season when he placed third in the World Cup stop in Seoul. He won a bronze medal at the 2015 World Single Distance Championships and a silver medal in the 1000m at the 2022 Beijing Winter Olympics.

Career

World Cup Career
During the 2021–22 ISU Speed Skating World Cup stop in Calgary, Dubreuil broke the Canadian record in the 500 metres event by racing to a time of 33.778. Dubreuil won a medal in the first eight World Cup races.

Winter Olympics

2018
Dubreuil qualified to compete for Canada at the 2018 Winter Olympics.

2022
Dubreuil qualified to compete for Canada at the 2022 Winter Olympics.

He competed in the 500m event and finished up fourth. During his race, he was charged with a false start. This was questioned by Bart Veldkamp, who called it "very suspicious". However Dubreuil said the false start was not an excuse for him not winning a race, and saying "it's something that's totally possible to overcome. It's just a minor inconvenience. That was not the difference."

In the 1000m race, he finished second, earning the silver medal, his first Olympic podium finish.

References

External links

1992 births
Living people
Canadian male speed skaters
People from Lévis, Quebec
Sportspeople from Quebec
Speed skaters at the 2018 Winter Olympics
Speed skaters at the 2022 Winter Olympics
Medalists at the 2022 Winter Olympics
Olympic medalists in speed skating
Olympic silver medalists for Canada
Olympic speed skaters of Canada
World Single Distances Speed Skating Championships medalists
Université Laval alumni
World Sprint Speed Skating Championships medalists
21st-century Canadian people